"All That She Wants" is a song by Swedish group Ace of Base. It was released in Scandinavia in 1992 as the second single from their first studio album, Happy Nation (1992), and in the following year, it was released as the first single from the 1993 album The Sign in North America. Produced by Denniz Pop, Jonas Berggren, and Ulf Ekberg, the drum beat was inspired by the Kayo song "Another Mother".

"All That She Wants" is a reggae-pop song that describes a sexually promiscuous woman, with the word "baby" being synonymous with "boyfriend". The song was first recorded in 1991, but went through many renditions before it was officially released.

The song was a commercial success, reaching the top of the charts in many countries, including Denmark, Germany, the UK and Australia. The single was certified platinum in the United States, where it peaked at number two on the Billboard Hot 100 and was one of the best-selling singles of that year.

In 2007, the song was re-recorded by the band as a three-piece with new lyrics in a first-person perspective, but was never officially released. This re-recording was leaked online in June 2016 in a collaboration version of the song that features new Ace of Base vocals alongside Britney Spears's vocals from her own 2007 demo version.

Background
While the group's predecessor single, "Wheel of Fortune", was a modest success, "All That She Wants" led Ace of Base to take off internationally. In 1991, the group produced a demo version of "All That She Wants", titled "Mr. Ace", which featured different lyrics, Linn Berggren on lead vocals, and rap vocals performed by both Jonas and Ekberg. But they were not able to create the exact sound they were looking for, despite their attempts to get inspiration by listening to several other artists. After the release of the Swedish top 20 hit "Another Mother" by Kayo, the band finally found the drum beat they were looking for.

Jonas and Ekberg contacted the producer of "Another Mother", Denniz Pop, and sent him a demo tape featuring the song. Though Denniz was initially unimpressed with the song, the tape got stuck in the cassette tape player in his car. Because of this, he was forced to listen to it over and over again, which helped him decide to help produce the track.

Composition

Denniz Pop introduced many changes to the song. He was not fond of the rap vocals on the original demo, and these were subsequently replaced with short spoken word sections. A new second verse was also added. Though vocals were recorded by all four members for this version, Jenny's vocals were eventually cut on the final release. The song was initially in a major key, but was changed to minor upon Linn's insistence. Jenny Berggren, sister to Linn and Jonas, explained that changing the key to minor allowed the song to portray a greater level of sadness and increased its relatability. Some of the other material on the Happy Nation album stemmed from "All That She Wants", leading the album to have a darker sound.

The final version of the song evolved into a dark fusion of dub-reggae with pop which became the band's trademark sound. The song is performed in the key of C minor with a tempo of 94 beats per minute in common time. The vocals span from G3 to C5. Jenny noted that it was about "a woman who is always leaving and that is because the woman is not whole in herself." Jonas stated that the song "is about a girl I knew a long time ago, but I didn't [realize that] when I did the lyrics."

Release
Following its release on 31 August 1992, "All That She Wants" quickly climbed to number one on the Danish chart while "Wheel of Fortune" was still sitting at number two. The song became a commercial success, reaching the top of the charts in at least thirteen countries worldwide. It was certified platinum in the United States, after peaking at number two on the Billboard Hot 100. Keen to rush out an album for the Christmas market, Mega Records pressed the band for an album and it was hastily recorded, mixed, and released within a few weeks. Denniz Pop would go on to co-produce all officially released versions of the song that were available at the time, notably a more uptempo version of the song, dubbed the "Madness Version". This version features entirely different vocals and more spoken-word sections. Ace of Base would later collaborate with Denniz Pop on "The Sign" and multiple tracks on the band's sophomore release, The Bridge.

In 2014, the original demo version of the song was released as a bonus track called "Mister Ace (Demo 1991)" on the remastered version of the album The Sign.

Reception

Critical reception

American reception
AllMusic editor Stephen Thomas Erlewine said that it is easy to see why the song was a hit: "the beat is relentless and the hooks are incessantly catchy". Thomas Ginsberg from Associated Press noted its "unique sound". A writer for The Baltimore Sun called it Ace of Base's "finest, loneliest hit". Larry Flick from Billboard wrote that the group "wears its ABBA influences proudly on this shuffling, reggae-splashed ditty." He added, "Factor in curious and vague lyrics, and you have a left-of-center offering that may entice quirky minds, but will probably leave most scratching their heads." Dave Sholin from the Gavin Report commented, "The last time a new act from Sweden came on this strong it was Roxette with "The Look". Since we got hold of the import several months ago, the word about this release has spread. Not every song that reaches #1 in the U.K. like this one did succeeds in America, but they all would if they were this hot. Can't imagine it would take more than one listen to be convinced." Chuck Eddy from LA Weekly stated, "As far as I can remember, "All That She Wants" by Ace of Base is the only hit single ever to talk about a lady who uses men for stud service so that she can become an unwed mother." He added that it "has the frostbit feel of ABBA's ballads about working women", and noted "how she warns "She's gonna getcha" in a demonic Eurodisco catwoman voice."

Fred Shuster from Los Angeles Daily News said it is a "supremely catchy pop confection with a bouncy reggae-inspired bass line and a chorus that lodges itself in the brain with deadly precision." Dennis Hunt from Los Angeles Times wrote that it has "a strong European pop-synth feel, cruising on reggae undercurrents and mined with some deadly hooks." Mario Tarradell from the Miami Herald stated, "Just try to shake the irresistible hook of All That She Wants and Happy Nation: you won't succeed." Jim Farber from the New York Daily News named it "the weirdest song on the radio now", adding that it "revives the dinky-sounding synths of early '80s new wave, smelts it to an improbable reggae beat, then plops on vocals by a woman whose grasp of English barely exceeds the phonetic." He concluded with that the song "could easily end up the "Maneater" of the '90s." Neil Strauss from The New York Times called it a "reggae-infused dance-floor sleeper" that "tells of a troubled woman's search for romantic fulfillment in one-night-stands." Steve Dougherty from People Magazine deemed it a "hummable [and] reggae-flavored" tune. A reviewer from Press-Telegram stated that it is "packed with unforgettable hooks." The Rolling Stone Album Guide noted that the "Ennio Morricone-style keyboard whistle marks the welfare-state cautionary tale "All That She Wants". Chuck Campbell from Scripps Howard News Service called it "a lilting dance song about a woman seeking a steady stream of boyfriends", noting that it "had remarkable staying power on the charts".

European reception
Irish Evening Herald described the song as "pure pop Esperanto. Simple, sublime and subversive. The weirdest record since Boney M's "Rasputin"." A reviewer from Göteborgs-Posten said it "smells a little like Dr. Alban with its reggae". Ben Thompson from The Independent wrote, "The first No 1 from Sweden since Abba. Who said pop was dead?" Kim Såtvedt from Norwegian Laagendalsposten felt that "All That She Wants" "holds magic". In his weekly UK chart commentary, James Masterton said, "Ace Of Base doing a Sub Sub if you like and making a stirring chart debut by being not only the current trendy dance hit but also a damn good pop tune and receiving a bucketload of radio airplay as a result." He also declared it as a "perfectly crafted piece of dub-reggae". After "All That She Wants" had reached number-one in Denmark in 1992, Music & Media declared the song as "another great example of a band which has successfully drawn the pop reggae card." Sylvia Patterson from Smash Hits viewed it as "unfeasibly catchy".

Commercial performance
"All That She Wants" reached the number-one position in thirteen countries: Australia, Austria, Belgium, Canada, Denmark, Germany, Greece, Iceland, Israel, Italy, Spain, Switzerland and United Kingdom. In the latter, it peaked in its third week at the UK Singles Chart, on 16 May 1993. It spent three weeks at the top position on the chart. The song peaked at top three positions in most other places where it was released. The song was a very successful radio hit in the United States, peaking at number one on the US Billboard Top 40 Mainstream chart. On the Billboard Hot 100, it peaked at number two in 1993.

"All That She Wants" was listed at number 9 on the Billboard 1994 year-end charts and at number 70 on the 1990s decade-end charts. In Germany, the song was the best-selling single of 1993.

The single had sold 604,000 copies in United Kingdom in 1993.

According to Mega Records, the single sold 3.7 million copies worldwide as of May 1998.

Retrospective response
In 2018, Annie Zaleski from The A.V. Club wrote, "The song—which can be read as either a celebration of a woman who enjoys one-night stands, or a warning to her potential suitors—is a catchy marvel of simplicity. A glacial synth hum and strolling reggae rhythm provide propulsion, while the occasional saxophone curlicue and mysterious whistle give it intrigue, as well as a hint of melancholy." A writer for Birmingham Evening Mail described it as a "happy uplifting reggae-influenced" song. Matt Stopera and Brian Galindo from BuzzFeed stated that it is "the best Ace of Base song. End of story. No contest." Nikola Nedeljkovic Gøttsche from Dagbladet Information noted in their retrospective review of The Sign, that "the song about the promiscuous man-hunter who only wants one more lover, with its mysterious flute melodies, progressive reggae pulse and instantly obsessive chorus, became a marker in the nineties popular musical landscape." Tom Ewing of Freaky Trigger wrote that "All That She Wants" is "so startling that you imagined a whole style around it. The sound of "All That She Wants" is disarmingly simple – high, clear, piping synths over a basic skank – but also quite perfect. It's a cooling sound, it makes the rest of pop sound busy and overheated. As the song so poetically puts it, "It's not a day for work – it's a day for catching time". Bob Waliszewski of Plugged In said the song "warns a young man about a woman out for a one-night stand ("She's a hunter, you're the fox... beware of that flashing in her eyes")." Pop Rescue called it "fantastic", remarking that "it's a simple uncluttered track, and it works perfectly." Christopher Smith from Talk About Pop Music viewed it as a "quirky number".

Accolades

(*) indicates the list is unordered.

Music video
A music video directed by Swedish director Matt Broadley was produced in November 1992 to promote the single. Danish actress and singer-songwriter  appears in the video as the title character. The video was filmed in Nielsen's apartment in Copenhagen in one day, on a budget of $2000.

The video, shot in sepia tone, depicts the band members performing in a cramped apartment, interlaced with shots of a woman getting ready to go out. She goes to a bar where she meets a man. They talk and then she takes him home to her. Though Jenny has no vocals in the song, she lip syncs the vocals during the chorus. Ekberg noted, "The video is also an explanation for the song, because in the song you don't know if she found a guy or not, but [the video shows] a happy ending."

Ekberg later said that MTV pushed the song as they "loved the video because it was so clean." As of August 2022 the video reached 120 million views on YouTube.

Track listings

United Kingdom CD single
"All That She Wants" (Radio Edit)
"All That She Wants" (12" Version)
"All That She Wants" (Banghra Version)
"All That She Wants" (Madness Version)

United States CD single
"All That She Wants" – 3:31
"All That She Wants" (Extended Single/Dub Version) – 7:56
"All That She Wants" (Banghra Version) – 4:15
"All That She Wants" (12" Version) – 4:46

Australian CD single
"All That She Wants" (Radio Edit)
"Fashion Party"

All That She Wants (Remixed) – Standard Digital Download
All That She Wants (Funkstar De Luxe Cook 'n' Curry Remix) – 3:27
All That She Wants (We Are Legends Remix) – 6:18
All That She Wants (Bali Bandits Remix) – 4:00
All That She Wants (Joeysuki Remix) – 4:51
All That She Wants (Andalo Remix) – 3:24
All That She Wants (House of Titans Remix) – 3:55
All That She Wants (Marc MacRowland Remix) – 6:01
All That She Wants (Funkstar De Luxe Cook 'n' Curry Remix Extended) – 4:52
All That She Wants (Bali Bandits Remix Extended) – 6:01
All That She Wants (Andalo Remix Extended) – 5:41

All That She Wants (Remixed) – Beatport Edition Digital Download
All That She Wants (We Are Legends Remix) – 6:18
All That She Wants (Joeysuki Remix) – 4:51
All That She Wants (House of Titans Remix) – 3:55
All That She Wants (Marc MacRowland Remix) – 6:01
All That She Wants (Funkstar De Luxe Cook 'n' Curry Remix Extended) – 4:52
All That She Wants (Bali Bandits Remix Extended) – 6:01
All That She Wants (Andalo Remix Extended) – 5:41
All That She Wants (Bali Bandits Remix Extended Instrumental) – 6:00
All That She Wants (Andalo Remix Extended Instrumental) – 5:41

Release history

Charts

Weekly charts

Year-end charts

Decade-end charts

Certifications and sales

Cover versions and sample
An Italian band Age of Bass covered the song in 1993. Its close resemblance to the original Ace of Base version and the original band's name caused Mega Records alongside Polygram to prompt the rendition's record label Discomagic Italy into pulling the release from commercial markets. The rendition would later appear in a compilation release by Edel Records. In the same year, ZYX Music released a rendition performed by a German band called Box of Laces.

Swedish band Grass Show covered the song on their 1997 debut album Something Smells Good in Stinkville. American singer Britney Spears recorded a song titled "Remembrance of Who I Am" which sampled the chorus from "All That She Wants" for her 2007 album Blackout, but it failed to make the final cut for the album. The demo leaked onto the internet in January 2008.

See also

List of number-one singles in Australia during the 1990s
List of number-one hits of 1993 (Austria)
List of Billboard Mainstream Top 40 number-one songs of the 1990s
List of number-one singles of 1993 (Canada)
List of number-one hits of 1993 (Germany)
List of number-one hits of 1993 (Italy)
List of number-one singles of 1993 (Spain)
List of number-one singles of the 1990s (Switzerland)
List of RPM number-one dance singles of 1993
List of UK Singles Chart number ones of the 1990s
VRT Top 30 number-one hits of 1993

References

1991 songs
1992 singles
Ace of Base songs
Arista Records singles
Mega Records singles
Song recordings produced by Denniz Pop
Songs written by Jonas Berggren
Songs written by Ulf Ekberg
Number-one singles in Australia
Number-one singles in Austria
Number-one singles in Belgium
Number-one singles in Denmark
Number-one singles in Germany
Number-one singles in Greece
Number-one singles in Iceland
Number-one singles in Italy
Number-one singles in Spain
Number-one singles in Switzerland
RPM Top Singles number-one singles
UK Singles Chart number-one singles
Ultratop 50 Singles (Flanders) number-one singles
Music videos directed by Matt Broadley
Songs about casual sex